Terminalia buceras is a tree in the Combretaceae family. It is known by a variety of names in English, including bullet tree, black olive tree, gregorywood (or gregory wood), Antigua whitewood, and oxhorn bucida. It is native to Mexico, Central America, the Caribbean, and northern South America. It is commonly found in coastal swamps and wet inland forests in low elevations.

Distribution
The species is native to an area in the South, Central and North America, from Colombia to Southern Mexico and Florida. Countries and regions in which it grows are: Colombia; Panama; Costa Rica; Venezuelan Antilles; Nicaragua; Windward Islands; Southwest Caribbean; Honduras; Guatemala; Mexico (Southeast, Southwest, Gulf, Central); Leeward Islands; Belize; Dominican Republic; Jamaica; Puerto Rico; Haiti; Cuba; Turks-Caicos Islands; Bahamas; U.S.A. (Florida). It is regarded as introduced to Trinidad and Tobago.

Growth
To grow it prefers high sunlight and rich, moist, well drained soil. It is highly tolerant to salt, insects, fungus, wind, and air pollution. Its roots are able to dig up paving stones and damage foundations.

Wood
The wood of the bullet tree is extremely hard and durable. Being highly resistant to insects and fungi, it is sometimes used for house posts or bridge timbers. The bark may be used for tanning leather due to its tannin content. It is also often used as an ornamental/shade tree.

The wood was also used for ship construction during the Age of Sail.

References

buceras
Trees of Mexico
Trees of South America